Park Jang-hyuk (born 31 October 1998) is a South Korean short track speed skater. He won a silver medal at the 2022 Winter Olympics in the men's 5000 metre relay.

Filmography

Television show

References

Living people
1998 births
Short track speed skaters at the 2022 Winter Olympics
Olympic short track speed skaters of South Korea
South Korean male short track speed skaters
Sportspeople from Seoul
Olympic silver medalists for South Korea
Medalists at the 2022 Winter Olympics
Olympic medalists in short track speed skating
21st-century South Korean people